Johnny Mike is a Canadian politician, who was elected to the Legislative Assembly of Nunavut in the 2013 election. He represented the electoral district of Pangnirtung. and served as Minister of the Environment in the Executive Council of Nunavut, until his defeat in the 2017 election.

References

Living people
Members of the Executive Council of Nunavut
Members of the Legislative Assembly of Nunavut
Inuit from the Northwest Territories
Inuit politicians
People from Pangnirtung
21st-century Canadian politicians
Inuit from Nunavut
Year of birth missing (living people)